Vernee was a brand of cellphones produced by the China based Shenzhen New-Bund Network Technology Co,. Ltd. The brand was founded in February 2016, marking the first step of New-bund's transfer from OEM/ODM to public market. Vernee phones use the Android operating system.

The company has pricing policies that allow them to put mid range hardware on low end Prices, accompanied with Android OS.

Vernee their last YouTube has been uploaded on the 11th of February, following no more videos, products. Their website is offline since February 2020.

List of smartphones

References

External links
Vernee Website

Mobile phone manufacturers
Manufacturing companies based in Shenzhen
Chinese brands
Android (operating system) devices
Smartphones